Temesa can refer to:
 Temesa (ancient city), an ancient city in Magna Graecia
 Temesa (gastropod), an extinct genus of land snails